Arbon Seemoosriet railway station is a railway station in the municipality of Arbon, in the Swiss canton of Thurgau. It is located on the Lake line of Swiss Federal Railways. It is one of two stations in the municipality; the other, is the next station south on the line.

Services 
 the following services stop at Arbon Seemoosriet:

 St. Gallen S-Bahn : half-hourly service between Rorschach and Romanshorn and hourly service to Weinfelden; on Saturdays and Sundays, service every two hours from Rorschach to  via .

References

External links 
 
 

Railway stations in the canton of Thurgau
Swiss Federal Railways stations